The route of the 2010 Winter Olympics torch relay carried the torch through over 1000 communities across Canada, visiting different locations from October 30, 2009 to its final stop at BC Place in Vancouver, British Columbia on February 12, 2010.

Route in Greece
Route in Greece as follow.

Route in Canada

See also
 2008 Summer Olympics torch relay route

References

 "", "The Torch in Pickering" Olympic Torch Run through Pickering, Ontario.

External links
 "Provincial and territorial routes", Vancouver 2010 official site, listing the exact stops on the tour.

Olympic torch relay route
Torch relay route
Olympic torch relays